Andrea Benetti (born 15 January 1964) is an Italian painter, the author of the Manifesto of Neo Cave Art presented in 2009, at the 53rd Venice Biennale, at the Ca' Foscari University.

Biography 

Andrea Benetti is an Italian painter, photographer and designer, born in Bologna in 1964. In 2006 he authored the Manifesto of Neo-Cave Art, which he presented at the 53rd Venice Biennale of Art in 2009. 
His art is inspired by a direct reference and indirectly to the first forms of art made by prehistoric man. From the cave works, Benetti borrowed their stylistic features from a creative point of view, creating works crowded with stylized zoomorphic and anthropomorphic motifs, geometric shapes and abstract shapes, with fields of color, as if to create an ethical and philosophical bridge between prehistory and contemporaneity, emphasized by 'use of vegetable pigments and techniques such as bas-relief and graffiti. 
His work is present in the main national and foreign art collections (such as those of the United Nations, the Vatican and the Quirinale), among his most recent exhibitions are "Colors and sounds of the origins" (Bologna, Palazzo D'Accursio, 2013), "VR60768 · anthropomorphic figure" (Rome, Chamber of Deputies, 2015), "Pater Luminum" (Gallipoli, Civic Museum, 2017) and "Faces against violence" (Bologna, Palazzo D'Accursio, 2017). 
In 2020 the artist was awarded the "Nettuno Prize" of the city of Bologna.

Museums and collections 

Private and institutional museums and art collections, which have acquired the works of Andrea Benetti

 United Nations Art Collection (New York City, United States)The work is: "Against violence", 2007, cm 14 x 19, oil and acrylic on canvas
 Vatican Art Collection (Città del Vaticano)The work is: "Omaggio a Karol Wojtyla", 2009, cm 70 x 50, oil, cacao and acrylic on canvas
 MACIA – Italian Contemporary Art Museum In America (San José – Costa Rica)The work is: "Giochi d'infanzia", 2008, cm 60 x 40, oil and karkadè on canvas
 Quirinal Art Collection ∙ Italian Presidency Of The Republic ∙ (Rome – Italy)The work is: "Caccia VII", 2010, cm 50 x 100, oil, henna and acrylic on canvas
 Palazzo Montecitorio ∙ Italian Parliament ∙ Chamber Of Deputie (Rome – Italy)The work is: "9 novembre 1989", 2009, cm 60 x 80, oil and karkadè on canvas
 University of Ferrara Art Collection (Ferrara – Italy)The work is: "Ominide di Porto Badisco I", 2016, cm 50 x 50, palaeolithic sediment and oxides on canvas
 University of Bari Art Collection (Bari – Italy)The work is: "Imbarcazione con alberi", 2012, cm 50 x 60, oil, cacao and pigments on canvas
 Mambo ∙ Museum Of Modern Art Bologna (Bologna – Italy)The work is: "Fior di Loto", 2008, cm 60 x 60, oil and karkadè on canvas
 Museion ∙ Museum of Modern And Contemporary Art Bolzano (Bolzano – Italy)The work is: "Istinto primitivo II", 2009, cm 40 x 30, oil, henna, cacao and acrylic on canvas
 CAMeC – Camec ∙ Center of Modern and Contemporary Art – (La Spezia – Italy)The work is: "Grotta dei Cervi", 2015, cm 50 x 50, palaeolithic sediment and oxides on canvas
 F. P. Michetti Museum (Francavilla al Mare – Italy)The work is: "Le 3 tesi", 2009, cm 50 x 60, oil, henna and acrylic on canvas
 Osvaldo Licini Contemporary Art Museum (Ascoli Piceno – Italy)The work is: "Ominidi e animali I", 2013, cm 80 x 60, travertine, acrylic and plaster on canvas
 Municipality of Lecce Art Collection (Lecce – Italy)The work is: "La coerenza", 2009, cm 50 x 70, oil, henna and acrylic on canvas

Bibliography 

K. H. Keller, G. Rossi, R. Sabatelli: Andrea Benetti and Lanfranco Di Rico – September 2001, Johns Hopkins University, Bologna, 2008, 12 pages
Various authors: Arte e cultura – Un ponte tra Italia e Costa Rica, I.I.L.A., San Josè, 2008, 98 pages
Various authors: Natura e sogni – Catalogo del Padiglione della 53. Biennale di Venezia, Umberto Allemandi & C., Venice, 2009, 98 pages
Various authors: Esplorazione inconsueta all'interno della velocità, Bologna, 2009, 104 pages
Andrea Benetti, Gregorio Rossi: Il Manifesto dell'Arte Neorupestre, Umberto Allemandi & C., Venice, 2009, 18 pages
Carlo Fabrizio Carli: Diorama Italiano – 61º Premio Michetti, Vallecchi, Francavilla a Mare, 2010, 202 pages
C. Parisot, P. Pensosi: Portraits d'Artistes, Edizioni Casa Modigliani, Roma, 2010, 72 pages
Simona Gavioli: Andrea Benetti – B. P. Before Present, Media Brain, Bologna, 2009, 52 pages
Various authors: Andrea Benetti – La pittura Neorupestre, Comune di Castellana Grotte, Castellana Grotte, 2011, 58 pages
D. Iacuaniello, C. Parisot, G. Rossi: M173 – Tracce apocrife, Istituto Europeo Pegaso, Rome, 2012, 70 pages
G. Rossi, D. Scarfì: Il simbolismo nella pittura Neorupestre, Mediabrain, Syracuse, 2012, 88 pages
Andrea Benetti, Silvia Grandi: Colori e suoni delle origini, Qudulibri, Bologna, 2013, 86 pages
Andrea Benetti, Stefano Papetti: Dalla roccia alla tela – Il travertino nella pittura Neorupestre, Qudulibri, Ascoli P., 2014, 54 pages
A. Benetti, S. Cassano, D. Coppola, A. F. Uricchio: Colori e suoni delle Origini, Qudulibri, Bari, 2014, 58 pages
Andrea Benetti, Silvia Grandi: Il colore della luce, Qudulibri, Bologna, 2014, 56 pages
A. Benetti, S. Grandi, M. Peresani, M. Romandini, G. Virelli: VR60768 – anthropomorphic figure, Qudulibri, Rome, 2015, 80 pages
Andrea Benetti, Toti Carpentieri: Astrattismo delle origini, Qudulibri, Lecce, 2015, 60 pages
Various authors: Arte Neorupestre, Monograph, Qudulibri, Bologna, 2015, 208 pages
Andrea Benetti, Fiorenzo Facchini, Fernando Lanzi, Gioia Lanzi: Signum Crucis, Qudulibri, Bologna, 2016, 42 pages
A. Benetti – P. Fameli – A. Fiorillo – F. Fontana – M. Peresani – M. Romandini – I. Schipani – U. T. Hohenstein: "preHISTORIA CONTEMPORANEA" Qudulibri, Ferrara, 2016, 64 pages
A. Benetti – P. Fameli – A. Marrone – M. Ratti: "Omaggio alla pittura Rupestre", Qudulibri, La Spezia, 2016, 58 pages
Andrea Benetti – Silvia Grandi: "Volti contro la violenza", Qudulibri, Bologna, 2017, 40 pages

References

External links 
Andrea Benetti – Sito ufficiale – ITA
Andrea Benetti – Official site – ENG
Andrea Benetti in the Treccani encyclopedia
Andrea Benetti – The presentation video

21st-century Italian painters
20th-century Italian painters
Italian contemporary artists
Postmodern artists
People from Bologna
1964 births
Living people